SJD, or Sean James Donnelly, is a musician from Auckland, New Zealand. His music is a mix of pop-rock, soul, and electronic music. The name SJD also refers to Donnelly's touring band when not performing solo.

History
Donnelly has cited influences including Orchestral Manoeuvres in the Dark (OMD), Gary Numan, the Human League and Soft Cell. SJD's debut album 3 was initially self-released on Swarf Records as 120 CD-Rs in 1999 before being picked up by Flavour Distribution. After contributing a track to the Sideways compilation and playing alongside Phase 5 he then signed to the Round Trip Mars label. Second album Lost Soul Music was released in 2001. Southern Lights was released 2004 with assistance from government arts funding agency Creative New Zealand, yielding the single "Superman You're Crying" which met with some popular success in New Zealand and huge critical acclaim. Sean Donnelly and Angus McNaughton shared the 2005 New Zealand Music Awards Tuis for Best Producer and Best Engineer for their work on Southern Lights. Songs from a Dictaphone was released in July 2007 and followed by Dayglo Spectres, which is a collaborative effort with guitarist and fellow Round Trip Mars artist James Duncan (also in Dimmer), and was released in Oct 2008. His album Elastic Wasteland is entirely written, played, produced and mixed by Sean alone and was released on 16 November 2012.

SJD has collaborated with several other New Zealand musicians, including contributions to Dimmer's successful album You've Got to Hear the Music.

With Don McGlashan and Edmund McWilliams, he co-produced Don McGlashan's 2006 album Warm Hand and wrote "I Will Not Let You Down", which is on the album.

Sean Donnelly formed The Bellbirds in 2009 with Sandy Mill, Victoria Kelly and Don McGlashan. He writes most of their songs.

In 2011, he was part of Neil Finn's Pajama Club project.

In 2012 he produced an all-star cover version of Chris Knox's "Not Given Lightly" for the New Zealand Breast Cancer Foundation.

In 2013 SJD won the Taite Music Prize for his album Elastic Wasteland. In 2015, he released the album Saint John Divine.

Quotes
"There's a disadvantage in terms of connecting to an audience because New Zealand is a small country and you can't really survive off a cult audience. But having said that, the cultural isolation and the fact that you probably aren't really going to make it add an imperative to achieve on a more aesthetic level, as opposed to a more financial level. If you don't think you can succeed any other way, you've got to try and be true to your heart." -- New Zealand's pulsing electronica, New Zealand Herald (2001-06-08)

Discography

Albums

References

External links
 www.elasticwasteland.com
 www.roundtripmars.com
 New Zealand Musician Interview with SJD
 Sound.wav Music Interview with SJD 2015
 SJD music at amplifier.co.nz
 National Radio sampler Songs from a Dictaphone (2007)
 National Radio interview regarding Dayglo Spectres (2008)

Musicians from Auckland
Living people
Pajama Club members
1968 births